Laetesia weburdi is a species of sheet weaver found in New South Wales, Australia. It was described by Urquhart in 1980.

References

Linyphiidae
Fauna of New South Wales
Spiders of Australia
Spiders described in 1980